Evelyn King may refer to:

 Evelyn King (politician) (1907–1994), British politician
 Evelyn "Champagne" King (born 1960), American singer